Pierluigi "Pierlo" Marzorati (born 12 September 1952) is an Italian former professional basketball player. He is considered to have been one of the best point guards of all time in Europe, and was named the Mister Europa, in 1976. He was named one of FIBA's 50 Greatest Players in 1991. In 2007, he was inducted into the Italian Basketball Hall of Fame and enshrined into the FIBA Hall of Fame. In 2008, he was chosen as one of the 50 Greatest EuroLeague Contributors.

Club playing career
Marzorati was one of the key players of the Cantù team (in which he played from 1969 to 1991), winning 2 Italian League championships (in 1975 and 1981), 2 FIBA European Champions' Cup (EuroLeague) titles (1982 and 1983), 4 FIBA Cup Winners' Cups (1977, 1978, 1979 and 1981), 4 FIBA Korać Cups (1973, 1974, 1975 and 1991) and 2 FIBA Intercontinental Cups (1975 and 1982).

In July 2006, Marzorati decided to come back at age 54, to top class competitions with Cantù, for the 70th anniversary of the team. On 6 October 2006 he finally appeared in an official game for Cantù, playing two minutes in an Italian League game, against the Italian national league champions Benetton Treviso. Cantù won 70-69. This way, he became the first (and only) basketball player in history to have played official games in five different decades, as well as the oldest professional basketball player to have ever taken part in an official game.

National team career
Marzorati played in 278 games for the Italian national basketball team, scoring 2,209 points. He won the silver medal at the 1980 Summer Olympics in Moscow, the gold medal at the EuroBasket 1983, plus three bronze medals at the 1971, 1975, and 1985 EuroBaskets.

Post-playing career
Marzorati played his whole career with Cantù. He also became a vice-president for the club, and served in that capacity until 1996.

References

External links 
 
 FIBA Hall of Fame page on Marzorati
 FIBA Europe Profile
 Euroleague.net 50 greatest contributors
 Italian League Profile 
 

1952 births
Living people
Basketball players at the 1972 Summer Olympics
Basketball players at the 1976 Summer Olympics
Basketball players at the 1980 Summer Olympics
Basketball players at the 1984 Summer Olympics
FIBA EuroBasket-winning players
FIBA Hall of Fame inductees
Italian men's basketball players
1978 FIBA World Championship players
Lega Basket Serie A players
Medalists at the 1980 Summer Olympics
Olympic basketball players of Italy
Olympic medalists in basketball
Olympic silver medalists for Italy
Pallacanestro Cantù players
Sportspeople from the Province of Como
Point guards
1986 FIBA World Championship players